Howard Anthony Feggins (born May 6, 1965) is a former American football defensive back. He spent several seasons in the National Football League, but only played during the 1989 season with the New England Patriots.

Feggins played college football at North Carolina and totaled 169 career tackles in the Tar Heels secondary at cornerback and safety.

References

External links 
 

1965 births
Living people
American football defensive backs
North Carolina Tar Heels football players
New England Patriots players
London Monarchs players
People from South Hill, Virginia